Telstar 11 (former Orion 1) is a communication satellite in the Telstar series of the Canadian satellite communications company Telesat. The satellite was launched in 1994.

References

Telstar satellites
Spacecraft launched in 1994
1994 in spaceflight
1994 in Canada
Satellites using the Eurostar bus